As-Sajadah Mosque, also known as Asy-Syukr Mosque or Abi Dzar Mosque, is a mosque located 900 meters north of Al-Masjid an-Nabawi in Medina, Saudi Arabia. The mosque is called "As-Sajadah" meaning "the prostration" because of an account of the Islamic prophet Muhammad prostrating here after hearing a good news from Gabriel regarding salawat. Today, it is better known as Abi Dzar Mosque because it is on Abi Dzar street. It has been renovated and expanded in 2000.

See also 

 List of mosques in Medina
 List of mosques in Saudi Arabia
  Lists of mosques

References 

Mosques in Medina